Shatru Pakhha is a 1989 Indian Bengali film directed by Nripen Saha. It stars Chiranjeet, Prosenjit and  Satabdi Roy.

Cast 
 Chiranjeet
 Prosenjit
 Satabdi Roy
 Jnanesh Mukherjee
 Rajesh Raychoudhury
 Manoj Mitra
 Basabi Nandi
 Deb Singha
 Master Ritwit

References

External links 
 

Bengali-language Indian films
1980s Bengali-language films